Scrumpy & Western EP was the second record released by Adge Cutler and The Wurzels, containing the two tracks from their original 1966 hit single, "Drink Up Thy Zider" and "Twice Daily", with two further tracks "Pill, Pill" and "Hark At 'Ee Jacko". The band's first single had reached number 45 in the UK Singles Chart, despite the B-side, "Twice Daily" being banned by the BBC for being too raunchy. The subsequent Scrumpy & Western EP, released the following year, did not achieve a chart placing, however it gave its name to whole new genre of music: Scrumpy and Western. All the tracks were recorded live by Bob Barratt at The Royal Oak Inn, Nailsea, on 2 November 1966.

The front cover of the EP has a photo of Adge Cutler (seated) with the band, against the background of a typical farm building. All are wearing "yokel" outfits, which include corduroy trousers, waistcoats, red kerchiefs and hats. Cutler is holding the ubiquitous "Zider Jar".

"Drink Up Thy Zider" and Bristol City F.C.
Although The Wurzels song "One For The Bristol City" is the official club song for Bristol City F.C., most fans recognise "Drink Up Thy Zider" as their anthem. It is played at the final whistle at Ashton Gate if the home club win, and it is sung by fans along with another Wurzel song, "I am a Cider Drinker".

Scrumpy and Western Genre

The Scrumpy and Western genre refers to mainly humorous music from England's West Country that fuses comical folk-style songs, often full of double entendre, with affectionate parodies of more mainstream musical genres, all delivered in the local accent/dialect. Scrumpy is a name given to traditional Somerset cider, and is frequently referred to in The Wurzels' songs.

See also
List of bands from Bristol
West Country dialects
British popular music

References

External links
'Official Wurzels website
Adge Cutler & The Wurzels at AllMusic

1967 EPs
EPs by British artists
Comedy EPs
Columbia Records EPs
Scrumpy and Western